Lefort House, also known as Omega House, is a historic residence located at 1302 LA 1, in Thibodaux, Louisiana.

The structure is a -story Greek Revival raised-frame cottage immediately adjacent to Southern Pacific Railroad line. The original building was a small cottage built in c.1840 by the Boutary family, which was then connected to a larger Greek Revival structure in c.1855 by Pierce Lefort, after the property was purchased at a sheriff's sale.

The house was added to the National Register of Historic Places on September 4, 2008.

See also
 National Register of Historic Places listings in Lafourche Parish, Louisiana

References

Houses on the National Register of Historic Places in Louisiana
Greek Revival architecture in Louisiana
Houses completed in 1855
Houses in Lafourche Parish, Louisiana
National Register of Historic Places in Lafourche Parish, Louisiana